Chhang may refer to:

Chhaang, Himalayan beverage
Chhang, Nepal